San Bartolomé Yucuañe is a town and municipality in Oaxaca in south-western Mexico. The municipality covers an area of 65.07 km². It is part of the Tlaxiaco District in the south of the Mixteca Region.
As of 2005, the municipality had a total population of 380.

References

Municipalities of Oaxaca